The Barli Inscription (obtained from a Bhinaika village 36 miles southeast of Ajmer) belonging perhaps to 5th-4th century B.C. is one of the earliest Jaina inscriptions reported from Rajasthan.

History 

Earlier scholars assigned the Barli inscription to the pre-Ashokan period, but more recent scholars have assigned it to a later date.

According to historian G. H. Ojha, who discovered the inscription in 1912, the inscription contains the line Viraya Bhagavate chaturasiti vase, which can be interpreted as "dedicated to Lord Vira in his 84th year". Based on this reading, Ojha concluded that the record was inscribed in 443 BCE means 84 Years after the Nirvana of Tirthankara Mahavira. Vira is one of the epithets of 24th Tirthankara Mahavira.

K. P. Jayaswal also agreed with Ojha's reading. Indian Magazine Editor Ramananda Chatterjee has assigned the inscription to 4th Century BCE. On Paleographic grounds, the inscription can be assigned to the 2nd-1st century BCE.

Description 
This inscription is present on a piece of the pillar of dimension 13x10 inches. The inscription is written in Prakrit language. The writing was done by engraving, sewing, engraving, weaving, digging, piercing, burning, and punching. There are many defects in this inscriptions.

See also 
 Early Indian epigraphy
 Brahmi script

References

Citation

Sources

External links 
 Unacademy- rock inscriptions of rajasthan

Indian inscriptions
Jain inscriptions
History of Rajasthan
443 BC